Rice Shower (in Japanese: ライスシャワー, March 5, 1989 − June 4, 1995) was a Japanese Thoroughbred racehorse who won the multiple Group 1 titles.

History
His name refers to the tradition of throwing rice at weddings for good luck.

Rice Shower's first race was on September 21, 1991, when he won the 1991 Fuyo Stakes at Nakayama Racecourse.

On November 8, 1992, Rice Shower captured the first major win of his career by winning the 1992 Kikuka-shō, defeating the favored Mihono Bourbon in the process. This was the horse's only win of 1992, though he came in second at the 1992 Tokyo Yūshun.

Rice Shower had a strong 1993 season. He captured the Nikkei Sho on March 21st, then followed it up by winning the April 23rd, Tenno Sho, which are both Group 1 titles.

He was winless in 1994, but in 1995, he captured the Tenno Sho (Spring) for a second time on April 23rd, dashing hopes for Mejiro McQueen to win the race three times in a row.

Rice Shower died on June 4, 1995. He fell during a race at the 1995 Takarazuka Kinen and was euthanized. He was 6 years old at the time.

Pedigree

See also
 List of historical horses

References

1989 racehorse births
1995 racehorse deaths
Horses who died from racing injuries
Racehorses bred in Japan
Racehorses trained in Japan
Thoroughbred family 1-c